This is the results breakdown of the local elections held in the Region of Murcia on 3 April 1979. The following tables show detailed results in the autonomous community's most populous municipalities, sorted alphabetically.

City control
The following table lists party control in the most populous municipalities, including provincial capitals (shown in bold).

Municipalities

Cartagena
Population: 162,630

Lorca
Population: 64,711

Murcia
Population: 283,552

References

Murcia
1979